Note: Anton Chekhov (1860–1904) has also written a short story called The Lottery Ticket.

The Lottery Ticket (1886) is an adventure novel written by Jules Verne. It was also published in the United States under the title Ticket No. "9672".

Publication history
1886, US, New York: George Munro, published as Ticket No. "9672"
1886, UK, London: Sampson Low, Marston, Searle, & Rivington.

External links

 
 
  

1886 French novels
Novels by Jules Verne
Works about lotteries